USS Henley has been the name of three ships in the United States Navy named for Robert Henley. A fourth ship was named for his brother, John D. Henley.

She was sold in 1934

See also

United States Navy ship names